Nash Law Office is a historic office building located at Hillsborough, Orange County, North Carolina.  It was built in 1801, and is a small one-story, frame building with a gable roof and low brick foundation.  It has a brick exterior end chimney and a small one-story wing added in 1865.  The building housed the law office of jurist Frederick Nash (1781-1858).  Following his death it housed a school and was purchased by the Hillsborough Historical Society in 1970.

It was listed on the National Register of Historic Places in 1971.  It is located in the Hillsborough Historic District.

See also 
 Alfred Moore Scales Law Office: NRHP listing in Madison, North Carolina
 Brown-Cowles House and Cowles Law Office: NRHP listing in Wilkesboro, North Carolina
 Thomas B. Finley Law Office: NRHP listing in Wilkesboro, North Carolina
 Archibald Henderson Law Office: NRHP listing in Salisbury, North Carolina
 Zollicoffer's Law Office: NRHP listing in Henderson, North Carolina
 National Register of Historic Places listings in Orange County, North Carolina

References

External links

Historic American Buildings Survey in North Carolina
Office buildings on the National Register of Historic Places in North Carolina
Commercial buildings completed in 1801
Hillsborough, North Carolina
Buildings and structures in Orange County, North Carolina
National Register of Historic Places in Orange County, North Carolina
Individually listed contributing properties to historic districts on the National Register in North Carolina
Law offices
Legal history of North Carolina